Talk To Me: Hits, Rarities & Gems is the compilation album by Wild Orchid. It was recorded at RCA records for the previous studio albums and released by Sony BMG.  It was re-released exactly two years later, on September 26, 2008 as 20th Century Masters - The Millennium Collection: The Best of Wild Orchid.  The re-release had new cover art. The compilation doesn't feature any songs taken from Hypnotic.

Track list
 "Talk To Me" (radio version) 3:55
 "Supernatural" (mainstream radio version) 4:07
 "At Night I Pray" (single version) 4:20
 "The River" (main version)
 "Stuttering (Don't Say)" (radio version) 3:58
 "Lies" (single version)
 "Be Mine" (rhythm mix) 3:49
 "Holding On" (radio version] 3:26
 "Follow Me" (main version)
 "Talk To Me" (Junior Vasquez deluxe club mix) 6:17

References

Wild Orchid (group) albums
2006 compilation albums